Anna-Christina Engels-Schwarzpaul is a German-New Zealand design academic. She is currently a full professor at the Auckland University of Technology.

Academic career

After a 2001 PhD thesis titled  'Myth, symbol, ornament: The loss of meaning in transition'  at the University of Auckland, she moved to the Auckland University of Technology, rising to full professor.

Selected works 
 Engels-Schwarzpaul, A-Chr, and Michael A. Peters, eds. Of other thoughts: Non-traditional ways to the doctorate: A guidebook for candidates and supervisors. Springer Science & Business Media, 2013.
 Refiti, Albert. "Whiteness, smoothing and the origin of Samoan architecture." (2010).
 Engels-Schwarzpaul, A-Chr, and K-A. Wikiteria. "Take me away... in search of original dwelling." (2010).
 Engels-Schwarzpaul, A-Chr. "‘A warm grey fabric lined on the inside with the most lustrous and colourful of silks’: dreams of airships and tropical islands." Journal of Architecture 12, no. 5 (2007): 525–542.

References

External links
  
 

Living people
Year of birth missing (living people)
New Zealand women academics
New Zealand designers
German designers
German emigrants to New Zealand
University of Auckland alumni
Academic staff of the Auckland University of Technology
Design educators
New Zealand women writers